Come On Over is a 1997 album by Shania Twain.

Come On Over may also refer to:

Music

Songs
"Come On Over" (Bee Gees song), 1975, later covered by Olivia Newton-John
"Come On Over" (Jessica Simpson song), 2008
"Come On Over" (Royal Blood song), 2014
"Come On Over" (Shania Twain song), 1999
"Come On Over" (Kym Marsh song), 2003

Albums
Come On Over (Olivia Newton-John album), 1976
Come On Over (Plain White T's album)
Come On Over, by Tyrone Davis

Other uses
Come On Over (film), 1922 American film directed by Alfred E. Green
Come On Over (play), by Conor McPherson
Come On Over (TV series), an American children's television series

See also
"Come On Over Baby (All I Want Is You)", by Christina Aguilera
Come Over (disambiguation)